Five ships of the Royal Navy have been called HMS Inflexible.

  was a 280-ton sloop-of-war launched in 1776. HMS Inflexible was disassembled at Quebec City and transported upriver in pieces and reassembled and commissioned 1776 at Saint-Jean on the upper Richelieu River upon a request of General Carleton. She carried eighteen 12-pounders. She fought at the battle of Battle of Valcour Island in 1776 under the command of John Schank. Her fate is unknown.
  was a 64-gun third-rate  launched in 1780. She was used as a storeship from 1793, a troopship from 1809 and was broken up in 1820.
  was a wooden screw sloop launched in 1845 and sold in 1864.
  was an ironclad battleship launched in 1876 and sold in 1903.
  was an  launched in 1907 and sold for scrapping in 1921.

Battle honours
Ships named Inflexible have earned the following battle honours:

Lake Champlain, 1776
Egypt, 1801
New Zealand, 1845−47
Crimea, 1854−55
China, 1856−60
Alexandria, 1882
Falkland Islands, 1914
Dardanelles, 1915
Jutland, 1916

See also 
 French ship Inflexible

Royal Navy ship names